Miguel de Torres (1593 – 1645) was a Roman Catholic prelate who served as Bishop of Potenza (1644–1645).

Biography
Miguel de Torres was born in Naples, Italy and ordained a priest in the Order of Preachers. On 3 January 1644, he was selected as Bishop of Potenza and confirmed by Pope Urban VIII on 18 April 1644. He served as Bishop of Potenza until his death in 1645.

References

External links and additional sources
 (for Chronology of Bishops) 
 (for Chronology of Bishops)  

17th-century Italian Roman Catholic bishops
1593 births
1645 deaths
Bishops appointed by Pope Urban VIII
Dominican bishops